Subarnamrigi railway station is an Indian railway station of the Lalgola Ranaghat Sealdah branch lines in the Eastern Railway zone of Indian Railways. The station is situated at Digha, Subarnamrigi in Murshidabad district in the Indian state of West Bengal. It serves Subarnamrigi village, Bhagawangola I block and surroundings areas. Lalgola Passengers and few EMU trains pass through the station.

Electrification
The Krishnanagar– section, including Subarnamrigi railway station was electrified in 2004. In 2010 the line became double tracked.

References

Railway stations in Murshidabad district
Sealdah railway division
Kolkata Suburban Railway stations